Oiophassus is an extinct genus of moth in the family Hepialidae. It contains only one species, Oiophassus nycterus, which was described from Shanwang Bed sw2 in the Linchu district, Shantung province in China, which is part of an Astaracian lacustrine sandstone/mudstone in the Shanwang Formation.

References

Fossil Lepidoptera
Fossil taxa described in 1989
†
Fossils of China
†